The Cedar Tree is an Australian musical play produced in the wake of the success of Collits' Inn. The 1934 Melbourne production at the Princess Theatre was presented by F. W. Thring and starred Gladys Moncrieff.

It was inspired by a visit Varney Monk made to the town of Windsor in New South Wales.

Reviews were positive however it failed to repeat the success of Collits Inn.

Plot
A story of cedar cutters and boat builders on the Hawkesbury River in the 1840s.

Songs
"The Cedar Tree"
"We Never Really Meant Goodbye"
"How I Love You"
"It Had to Be"
"Jolly Roger"
"March of the Pioneers"
"Cupid Follows the Mole"
"Hawkesbury River Road"

References

Australian musicals
1934 musicals